Emily Weber is a member of the Missouri House of Representatives representing the 24th district. She succeeded fellow Democrat Judy Morgan. Weber was born in South Korea.

Missouri House of Representatives

Committee assignments 

 Agriculture Policy
 General Laws
 Ways and Means
 Special Committee on Tourism

Source:

Electoral history

References

South Korean people
People from Kansas City, Missouri
Democratic Party members of the Missouri House of Representatives
Women state legislators in Missouri